Llanos del Caudillo is a municipality in Ciudad Real, Castile-La Mancha, Spain. It has a population of 692.

History 

Llanos del Caudillo was founded by colonist families in the 1950s, subsidized by the Instituto Nacional de Colonización of the Spanish government.

It was first established as an Entidad Local (Local Entity) carved out of Manzanares municipal term. 

The term 'Caudillo' in its name refers to Francisco Franco, the general who ruled over Spain as a military dictator from 1939 until his death in 1975.

References

External links
Llanos del Caudillo, Tourism

Municipalities in the Province of Ciudad Real